Trionyx javanicus may refer to:

 Asiatic softshell turtle (Amyda cartilaginea), which has a synonym of Trionyx javanicus.
 Indian softshell turtle (Nilssonia gangetica), which has a synonym of Trionyx javanicus.
 Leith's softshell turtle (Nilssonia leithii), which has a synonym of Trionyx javanicus.